Retjenu (rṯnw; Reṯenu, Retenu), was an ancient Egyptian name for Canaan and Syria. It covered the region from the Negev Desert north to the Orontes River. The borders of Retjenu shifted with time, but it generally consisted of three regions. The southernmost was Djahy, which had about the same boundaries as Canaan. Lebanon proper was located in the middle, between the Mediterranean and the Orontes River. North of Lebanon was designated Amurru, the land of the Amorites.

Occurrences of the term
Overall, numerous mentions of the Retjenu appear in Egyptian inscriptions.

12th Dynasty
The earliest attestation of the name occurs in the Sebek-khu Stele, dated to the reign of Senusret III (reign: 1878–1839 BCE), recording the earliest known Egyptian military campaign in the Levant and their victory over the Retjenu: "His Majesty proceeded northward to overthrow the Asiatics. His Majesty reached a foreign country of which the name was Sekmem (...) Then Sekmem fell, together with the wretched Retenu", where Sekmem (s-k-m-m) is thought to be Shechem.

Scarabs with the name "Retjenu" have been found in Avaris, also dating to the 12th Dynasty (1991-1802 BCE).

The name also occurs in the Tale of Sinuhe (written during the early 12th Dynasty), inscribed on a piece of limestone in the 14th century BCE.

17th Dynasty
Kamose, the last king of the Theban 17th Dynasty (c. 1580–1550 BCE), refers to Apepi, the Hyksos pharaoh, as a "Chieftain of Retjenu" in a stela that implies a Canaanite background for this Hyksos king.

18th Dynasty
The Retjenu people are depicted in the 18th Dynasty tomb of Rekhmire (TT100).

Depictions in Egyptian reliefs

See also
 Aamu
 Djahy

References

Geography of ancient Egypt
Canaan
Geography of Phoenicia